WTNM (93.7 FM, "Super Talk Mississippi") is an American radio station licensed to serve the community of Courtland, Mississippi. The station, established in 1985 as "WKLJ", is operated by Supertalk Mississippi and the WTNM broadcast license is held by Telesouth Communications, Inc.

WTNM broadcasts a news/talk format to the Oxford and Batesville, Mississippi, area.

The station was assigned the call sign "WQLJ" by the Federal Communications Commission (FCC) on June 16, 1992.

On May 28, 2015, WQLJ changed their format to news/talk, branded as "Super Talk Mississippi" (swapping formats with WTNM 105.5 FM Water Valley, MS). On June 4, 2015, the two stations also swapped call signs, with WQLJ taking on its current WTNM.

Previous logo

References

External links
WTNM official website

TNM
News and talk radio stations in the United States
Radio stations established in 1985
Panola County, Mississippi
1985 establishments in Mississippi